Michael Tschesno-Hell (17 February 1902 – 24 February 1980) was a screenwriter and cultural official of the Deutsche Demokratische Republik.

Life 
Born in Vilnius, Hell came from an impoverished petit bourgeois family that had emigrated to Germany after the First World War. He joined communist associations in his youth. He later studied law at the universities of Jena and Leipzig and in 1922 joined the Communist Party of Germany (KPD). During the Weimar Republic, Hell worked for various communist newspapers, as a translator and as a factory and farm worker.

After the Machtergreifung by the Nazis, he fled with his wife to France and later via the Netherlands to Switzerland, where he lived until 1945. Here he became, together with Stephan Hermlin and Hans Mayer publisher of the publication Über die Grenzen. At the end of the war, he returned to the Soviet Occupation Zone and was appointed vice-president of the "Central Administration for Resettlers" in 1945. In 1947, Hell was appointed head of the newly founded  in East Berlin, which he himself had co-founded. The basic attitude of Tschesno-Hell's works was thereby the glorification of the Soviet Union and the Red Army as well as the heroisation of the communist movement and of functionaries of the KPD, such as Karl Liebknecht and Ernst Thälmann.

Between 1967 and 1972, Tschesno-Hell was president of the Association of Film and Television Workers of the GDR. He was a member of the board of the GDR Writers' Association. Tschesno-Hell was the recipient of numerous high state awards. These include the National Prize of the GDR, which he received in 1954, 1957 and 1966.

Tschesno-Hell was married to the illustrator Ingeborg Meyer-Rey from 1951 to 1954. Mit seiner langjährigen Ehefrau Ursula Tschesno-Hell schrieb er gemeinsam an Drehbüchern, darunter Die Mutter und das Schweigen.

Tschesno-Hell died in East-Berlin at the age of 78.

His written legacy can be found in the archives of the Academy of Arts, Berlin.

Scripts and scenarios 
 1954: Ernst Thälmann – Sohn seiner Klasse
 1955: Ernst Thälmann – Führer seiner Klasse
 1956: The Captain from Cologne
 1965: Die Mutter und das Schweigen
 1965: Solange Leben in mir ist
 1969: Der Maler mit dem Stern
 1972: Trotz alledem!

Further reading 
 Michael Tschesno-Hell: Russland antwortet. Ein Reisebericht. Tägliche Rundschau/Kultur und Fortschritt, Berlin 1949.
 Herbert Mayer, Bernd-Rainer Barth: Tschesno-Hell, Michael. In  5th edition. Vol. 2. Ch. Links, Berlin 2010, .
 Ralph Hammerthaler: Der Bolschewist. Michael Tschesno-Hell und seine DEFA-Filme, Schriftenreihe der DEFA-Stiftung, Bertz + Fischer Verlag, Berlin 2016.

References

External links 

 
 
 
 Nachlass Bundesarchiv NY 4219

20th-century German writers
Recipients of the Patriotic Order of Merit in gold
Recipients of the Banner of Labor
Recipients of the National Prize of East Germany
1902 births
1980 deaths
Writers from Vilnius